Mile End Stadium, also known as the East London Stadium, is a multi-sports stadium in Mile End and situated in the park of the same name, East London, England. The stadium comprises an athletics stadium and a number of floodlit Astroturf football pitches, tennis and netball courts.

The new sports complex with a 25m swimming pool was refurbished in 2019.

The stadium is home to two senior football clubs:  Sporting Bengal United of the Essex Senior League and Leyton Orient Women of the FA Women's National League. It was formerly home to Tower Hamlets FC (and an earlier club, by the same name).

It hosted a concert by Britpop band Blur on 17 June 1995, where 27,000 fans saw the band supported by The Boo Radleys, Sparks, John Shuttleworth, Dodgy and Cardiacs.

Transport

Mile End Stadium is served by London Buses Routes 309, 277, D6, D7, and at Mile End 339, 323, 25, 205, 425, Night Route N205.

Mile End tube station is located nearby across Mile End Park for the Central line, District line and Hammersmith & City line services.

Cycle Superhighway CS2 passes close by on Mile End Road.

The Regent's Canal passes close by; offers access to walk or cycle on the towpath. Victoria Park, Globe Town or Limehouse Basin can be reached easily from here via the towpath.

References

Sport in the London Borough of Tower Hamlets
Athletics venues in London
Football venues in London
Mile End